Melonechinus is an extinct genus of echinoid that lived in the Carboniferous.  Its remains have been found in North America.

Sources

 Fossils (Smithsonian Handbooks) by David Ward (Page 175)

External links
Melonechinus in the Paleobiology Database

Echinocystitoida
Prehistoric echinoid genera
Carboniferous echinoderms of North America